Fort Boyard can refer to:

Fort Boyard (fortification)
Fort Boyard (game show), a game show set in the aforementioned fort, which first premiered in France in 1990
Fort Boyard: Ultimate Challenge, a joint US-UK 2011 production